Taw or TAW may refer to:

 Taw (letter), the twenty-second letter in many Semitic alphabets
 Taw (number), the collection of all cardinal numbers
 the shooter marble in a game of marbles
 the River Taw in Devon, England
 Taw (locomotive), a British narrow gauge railway locomotive built in 1897, named after the river
TAW, The Artist's Way
 Tai Wai station, Hong Kong Mass Transit Railway station code TAW
 Tawing with alum, a method of producing white leather
 Toa Airways, a Japanese airline
 Tomas Andersson Wij, Swedish singer, songwriter and journalist known by the initials TAW
 F-22 Total Air War, a fighter jet flight simulator game
 Total available water in soil for crops

See also
 Tau (disambiguation)
 Tav (disambiguation)